The Faculty of Marine Science and Ecology is the youngest unit in the structure of the Technical University of Varna.

Departments

Physics 

The physics department has been in existence since the beginning of the school in 1963. Katedrata existed in the structure of Electrical faculty. It began as "Physics and Chemistry" and became an independent department in 1976.

Heads of department 

 Kiril Kazandjiev Petrov (1963-1983)
 Janko Bojinov (1984-1989)
 Ilka Ilieva Yordanova (1990-1999)
 Valentin Lyutskanov Lyutskanov (1999-)

Department of Ecology and Environmental Protection 

This Department was created recently.

Heads of department 

 Nikolay Minchev

Department of Agronomy

Heads of department 

 Dimitrov Plamenov

Department of Economics and Management 

The department was established in 1966. The first teachers were Nikola Karklisiyski and Ivanka Chobanyaneva.

Heads of department 

 Nikola Karklisiyski
 Marin Kanchev
 Ivanka Chobanyaneva
 G. Raikov
 Fanny Ouzounova
 Dimitrichka Macedonian
 Svetlana Dimitraki

Department of Navigation, transport management and protection of the waterways 

This department was created as a "Marine training center".

Heads of department 

 Chavdar Branimirov Ormanov

References 

  (Bulgarian)(English)

Technical University of Varna
Buildings and structures of the Technical University of Varna